Stan Waldemore (born February 20, 1955) is a former American football offensive tackle and offensive guard in the National Football League for the New York Jets from 1978 to 1984.  He played in 62 games throughout his professional career.  He went to the University of Nebraska.

1955 births
Living people
American football offensive linemen
Nebraska Cornhuskers football players
New York Jets players
Players of American football from Newark, New Jersey